Gesvan-e Do (also Romanized as Geşvān-e Do and Gaswané Dow; also known as Gīsovān-e Do) is a village in Veys Rural District, Veys District, Bavi County, Khuzestan Province, Iran. At the 2006 census, its population was 77, in 10 families.

References 

Populated places in Bavi County